The Council of Ministers of Mali consists of members appointed by the president with the advice of the prime minister.

The Council of Ministers is chaired by the prime minister and is tasked with managing government operations.

Members of the Council of Ministers

Updated as of August 2020

The cabinet was changed after Ibrahim Boubacar Keïta took the office in 2013. It then was vacated after Keïta's resignation following his arrest by opposition-backed mutinying soldiers in August 2020.

References